Arwut Lab (Secret Weapons) is the second studio album from Christina Aguilar - a very popular Thai artist. The album was released 2 years after her debut. It breaks the stereotype that the second album of any artist is/was always unsuccessful - it was as successful as the first. It was well known in Thailand prior to reaching Japan. The video clip for Jing Mai Klua (Don't Mention the Truth) won MTV Asian Viewers Choice Award in 1992, marking the second time a Thai artist won such an award. The album reached 1,200,000 copies sold.

Track listing
 Jing Mai Klua (Not Fear the Truth)
 Mai Yak Ja Cheua Lei (Don't Wanna Believe)
 Panha Lok Tak (Endless Question)
 Wela Mai Chuai Arai (Time Doesn't Help)
 Rak Tong Mee Anakhot (Love Need Future)
 Khob Khun (Thanks) 
 Sia Jai Sia Form (?)
 Sak Wan Nueng (One Day)
 Tham Mai Long (Can't Do It)
 Ya Hai Tueng Wan Nan Lei (Don't wanna Reach That Day)
 Khor Hai Chok Dee (Good Luck)
 Khob Khun Eek Khung (Thanks Again)

Christina Aguilar albums
1992 albums
Thai-language albums